The Treason Act (Ireland) 1537 (28 Hen 8 c. 7, long title An Act of Slander) is an Act of the former Parliament of Ireland which adds several offences to the law of treason in Ireland. It was repealed in the Republic of Ireland in 1962 (but was obsolete well before then).

The Act makes the following conduct treason:
to "maliciously wish, will, or desire, by words, or writing, or by craft, imagin (sic), invent, practise, or attempt, any bodily harm to be done or committed to the King's most royal person, the Queen", or their heirs apparent;
or by such means to deprive them of the dignity, title or name of their royal estates;
to slanderously publish "by express writing, or words" that the Sovereign is a heretic, tyrant, schismatic, infidel or usurper of the Crown; or
to rebelliously "detain, keep or withhold" from the Sovereign his fortresses, ships, artillery, "or other munitions or fortifications of war", for longer than six days after being commanded to surrender them to the Sovereign.

The penalty for treason was death until 1998, when it was reduced to imprisonment for life or a lesser term. During the debate on the abolition of the death penalty, the 7th Earl of Onslow said:

Text
Section I of the Act reads as follows:

See also
Crown of Ireland Act 1542, which also adds further treasons to Northern Irish law, in addition to general UK law.
High treason in the United Kingdom
Treason Act
Misprision of treason
Treason Act 1842 which also deals with assaults on the Sovereign.

References

Sources
Primary

Citations

Acts of the Parliament of Ireland (pre-1801)
1537 in law
Treason in Ireland
Law of Northern Ireland
1537 in Ireland
Repealed Irish legislation